Mallia-E-Kitchen is an Indian cookery television series that premiered on Colors on 12 July 2009. The first season of series is hosted by Shruti Seth and is sponsored by LG Corp.

Each episode consists of a cookery competition between two women who prepare the same dish; however, one of them prepares it on the traditional gas stove and other concocts it in a microwave oven in a deadline of 20 minutes. The food concocted is first commented by a chef and then tasted by the celebrity guest, who is supposed to guess whether the dish (s)he liked was made on microwave or stove. The name of the winner is kept anonymous until the guest decides which one was the best. The winner is given the title of "LG Mallia-E-Kitchen" and an LG microwave oven from regional director(s) of LG.

Show Detail

References

External links
 LG Maliika-e-Kitchen Official Site

Colors TV original programming
Indian cooking television series
2009 Indian television series debuts
2012 Indian television series endings